Cebulki  (the Polish name means 'onions' or 'bulbs') is a village in the administrative district of Gmina Kozłowo, within Nidzica County, Warmian-Masurian Voivodeship, in northern Poland.

The village has a population of 240.

References

Cebulki